Calyptra albivirgata is a moth of the family Erebidae first described by George Hampson in 1926. It is found in Asia, including China and Japan.

References

Calpinae
Moths of Japan
Moths described in 1926